Grant's forest shrew (Sylvisorex granti) is a species of mammal in the family Soricidae found in the mountain forests of central Democratic Republic of the Congo, Kenya, Rwanda, Tanzania, and Uganda. Its natural habitat is subtropical or tropical moist montane forests.

The type locality of the species is Mubuku Valley in Uganda at  elevation.

Subspecies
The identified subspecies are:
S. g. granti, Thomas, 1907
S. g. mundus, Osgood, 1910.

References

Sylvisorex
Taxonomy articles created by Polbot
Mammals described in 1907
Taxa named by Oldfield Thomas